Local government in Northern Ireland was reorganised in 1973 by the Local Government (Boundaries) Act (Northern Ireland) 1971 and the Local Government Act (Northern Ireland) 1972. The county councils, county borough and municipal borough corporations and urban and rural district councils were replaced by twenty-six local government districts.

Elections took place for all the seats on the district councils on 30 May 1973. Elections were by proportional representation, using the single transferable vote system. The district councils came into their powers on 1 October.

Results

Overall

Results by council

References

1973
1973 United Kingdom local elections
1973 elections in Northern Ireland